"Get Back" is a song by American rapper Ludacris, from his album The Red Light District. It was released as the first single from the album and reached #13 on the Billboard Hot 100 in January 2005.

Music video
The music video features Dolla Boy from DTP's Playaz Circle, who makes a brief part of the song in which he and Ludacris both say, "I came I saw I hit 'em right dead in the jaw." The video also features a cameo from Fatlip, a former member of the group The Pharcyde who previously worked with the video's director Spike Jonze.

In popular culture
A remix of the song featuring rock band Sum 41 was also released as a single, featuring a much more rock and punk sound than the original song. The "Sum 41 Rock Remix" version was released as a bonus track on iTunes in the UK in both Ludacris' album The Red Light District and Sum 41's album Chuck. In addition to this, the remix was featured in the trailer for Smokin' Aces and A Haunted House 2.
The song is also featured as the ending theme of the critically well-received comedy blockbuster Tropic Thunder (where Tom Cruise does a hip hop dance to it). The song was also performed at the 2010 MTV Movie Awards where both Tom Cruise and Jennifer Lopez dance to the song.
American rock band Ra mixes the chorus and part of the verse from this song into their song "Skorn" as heard on the live album Raw. The singer Sahaj Ticotin claims that a member of their street team mixed the two songs together and this is where the idea came from.
A different Rock mix featuring Lazyeye was released on one of the "Get Back" singles in 2005. This version was heard in The Longest Yard and was performed live on The Tonight Show with Jay Leno and at the Spike TV Video Game Awards in 2004.
The song appeared in the teaser trailer for Smurfs: The Lost Village.

Charts

Weekly charts

Year-end charts

Certifications

Release history

References

External links
 

2004 singles
2004 songs
Ludacris songs
Sum 41 songs
Def Jam Recordings singles
Songs written by Ludacris
Music videos directed by Spike Jonze